Marcus Cliffe (born 1962 in Leeds, Yorkshire, England) is an English professional musician, currently the bass player in The Manfreds, a reunion of members of the 1960s pop group Manfred Mann (minus Manfred Mann himself). He has also worked with, amongst others, Brendan Croker, Mark Knopfler, Eric Clapton, and Rod Stewart. Cliffe is also a member of the jazz trio PBD with fellow Manfred musician Mike Hugg.

References

1962 births
Living people
English bass guitarists
English male guitarists
Male bass guitarists
Musicians from Leeds
The Notting Hillbillies members
The Manfreds members